Laserfiche is a privately owned software development company that creates enterprise content management, business process automation, workflow, records management, document imaging and webform software.

Laserfiche is headquartered in Long Beach, California, and has offices in Mexico, United Kingdom, Hong Kong, Shanghai and Canada.

Laserfiche sells its software through value-added resellers distributed throughout the world.

History
Nien-Ling Wacker founded Compulink Management Center Inc., a custom software development company, in 1974. By the early 1980s, Wacker had identified an emerging need among her clients for an electronic document repository that would provide both secure storage and instant retrieval of any word or phrase within documents.

The concept for a PC-based document management system began in 1981 when a client, a large Japanese auto manufacturer, required litigation support for a large volume of documents.  At the time, paralegals had to wade through thousands of pages of depositions, entering keywords into a database.  Attorneys were limited to searching on keywords to find relevant testimony. Nien-Ling Wacker realized that if a full-text index of every page were available, the search capabilities would be greatly enhanced, and the amount of physical labor required to index the documents would decrease substantially.  With the release of WORM drives that cost "only" $200 for 200MB of disk space, the conceived system could be made cost effective.

The first version of Laserfiche was released in 1987, becoming the first DOS-based document imaging system in the world.   The system used commercial off-the-shelf components such as OCR boards from Kurzweil, graphics monitors from Cornerstone, and scanner interface boards by Kofax.

Timeline

In 1993 Laserfiche released the first PC-based client–server document imaging system, based on the NetWare Loadable Modules platform.

In 2002, Laserfiche 6 marked the company's first foray into MSSQL-based document management. That year, the company also introduced Quick Fields, an automated document processing module, and WebLink, which provided read-only, Web-based access to documents stored in Laserfiche.

In 2004, Laserfiche 7 marked the company's first offering for Oracle users.

In early 2008, the company released Laserfiche 8, with a re-written workflow engine and integration with Microsoft SharePoint. In August 2008, the company launched Laserfiche Rio, an enterprise content management offering with unlimited servers, named user licensing and bundled functionality including content management, business process management and a thin-client interface called Web Access.

In 2009, Laserfiche opened an international office in Hong Kong, creating a separate company Laserfiche International.

In 2010, Laserfiche filed a lawsuit against SAP  for trademark infringement over the disputed trademark phrase "Run Smarter". In 2011, Laserfiche announced that the litigation had been settled amicably and involved a license of the "Run Smarter" trademark.

In 2011, Laserfiche released  Laserfiche Mobile for iPhone, an app that allows users to capture images with the phone's built-in camera, store them in the Laserfiche repository and include them in digital workflows. Later that year, Laserfiche was listed as a Champion in Info-Tech Research Group's Enterprise Content Management (ECM) for Process Workers Vendor Landscape. According to Info-Tech, "Laserfiche is a stalwart that is exploiting the new capabilities of emerging technology.

In 2012, Laserfiche released Laserfiche Mobile for iPad, an app that extends governance, risk and compliance standards to the iPad.

Laserfiche said it was profitable since 1994, growing at what Wacker describes as a managed pace.

In 2019, Laserfiche announced its integration with Microsoft Office 365, which allows customers to edit Microsoft Office documents directly on the web.

Products
Laserfiche has two main product lines: Laserfiche Rio and Laserfiche Avante.

Laserfiche Rio is designed to meet the needs of large organizations that have more than 100 users. It combines content management functionality with business process management (BPM), security and auditing, unlimited servers and a thin-client interface. Add-ons include DoD 5015.2-certified records management functionality, public Web portals and production-level document capture and processing.

Laserfiche Avante is an ECM suite for small to medium organizations with fewer than 100 users. It combines content management with workflow tools that automate business processes. Built on the Microsoft platform, Laserfiche Avante allows users to drag and drop e-mails from Outlook into Laserfiche.

The Laserfiche Institute
The Laserfiche Institute's stated mission is to "teach staff, resellers and current and prospective clients how to use Laserfiche most effectively." As a part of this mission, the Institute conducts conferences, web seminars and publishes document management guides, white papers and other educational content.

See also
Document Management
Enterprise Content Management
Business Process Management
Document Imaging
Records Management

References

External links
 
 
 
 Bloomberg coverage of the trademark lawsuit against SAP
  Laserfiche official web site

Companies based in Long Beach, California
Companies based in Los Angeles County, California
Software companies of the United States
Software companies established in 1974
Business software
Business software companies
Content management systems
Document management systems
1974 establishments in California
American companies established in 1974